White Angel is a 1994 British thriller film directed by Chris Jones and starring Harriet Robinson, Peter Firth and Don Henderson.

Premise
A crime writer is approached by a serial killer who wishes her to tell his story to the world.

Cast
 Harriet Robinson ...  Ellen Carter 
 Peter Firth ...  Leslie Steckler 
 Don Henderson ...  Inspector Taylor 
 Catherine Arton ...  Mik 
 Harry Miller ...  Alan Smith 
 Joe Collins ...  Graham 
 Caroline Staunton ...  Mrs. Steckler 
 Mark Stevens ...  Carter's husband 
 Inez Thorn ...  Dezerae 
 Suzanne Sinclair ...  Forensics expert 
 Jade Hansbury ...  Alan Smith's daughter 
 Chris Sullivan ...  Bank Manager 
 Ken Sharrock ...  Bank Teller
 Genevieve Jolliffe ... Director

References

External links

1994 films
1994 thriller films
1990s English-language films
British thriller films
1990s British films